Hypena obacerralis is a moth of the family Erebidae. It is found throughout Africa, the Middle East and South Asia (India, Sri Lanka) and Malaysia.

Description
Its wingspan is about 24–30 mm. Forewings much broader. The outer margin less oblique. Raised tufts are slight. Body pale or dark greyish reddish brown. Forewings slightly irrorated (speckled) with dark scales. There are traces of an antemedial waved line and a dark speck in the cell present. An oblique slightly sinuous rusty line runs from the costa before apex to middle of inner margin. Traces of an oblique dark line can be seen from the apex, often with a more or less complete dark specks series found on it. Abdomen and hindwings fuscous. Body color slightly paler or darker according to the region.

Larva known to feed on Commelina pacifica plants.

References

Lödl, (1994). "Zur Wiederauffindung der Type von Rhynchina obliqualis (Kollar, 1844) (Hypena) comb.n. im Naturhistorischen Museum in Wien, nebst Bemerkungen zur Synonymie (Inserta: Lepidoptera: Noctuidae)". Annalen des Naturhistorischen Museums in Wien. 96 B 369–372. 

obacerralis
Moths of Asia
Moths of the Comoros
Moths of Africa
Moths of Madagascar
Moths of Mauritius
Moths of Réunion
Moths of São Tomé and Príncipe
Moths of Seychelles
Moths described in 1859